Mariusz Adam Szczygieł (born 5 September 1966 Złotoryja, Poland) is a Polish journalist and writer. He is the winner of the 2009 European Book Prize for Gottland and the 2019 Nike Award, the most important prize in Polish literature, for his reportage Nie ma.

Life and career 
He graduated in journalism and political science from the University of Warsaw in 2000. 
At 16, he began writing for the weekly-paper Na przełaj. In spite of communist-era censorship, he published a shocking collection of reportages titled The Shrift, which were about gay and lesbian youth in Poland.

As a TV presenter of the popular program Na każdy temat (On Every Topic), Szczygieł was the first person in Poland to publicly speak the word "orgasm" on screen.

In 2002, he stopped working for TV Polsat and concentrated on writing for Gazeta Wyborcza. Presently, he is the first assistant manager of the weekly supplement Duży Format and assistant manager of its reportage-section.

His work is cited in every anthology of contemporary Polish journalism. Most notable are his studies of the Czechoslovak, and especially Czech, culture and life-style. His popular book Gottland (2006), is, according to Adam Michnik, the first cubistic reportage of the world. It received the European Book Prize as well as Polish Booksellers Prize as an extremely popular book on everything Czech.

His works have been translated into numerous languages including Czech, English, Estonian, German, Hebrew, Hungarian, Italian, Romanian, Russian, Slovak, Slovenian, Spanish, and Ukrainian.

Personal life
Szczygieł is an outspoken atheist. In 2022 in the book Fakty muszą zatańczyć (The Facts Must Dance) he came out as a gay man.

Awards and honours

1993: Polish Journalists' Association Award 
1996: Kryształowe Zwierciadło Award 
1997: Polsat TV Award (Best Talk Show category) 
2000: Award of the Polish Primate 
2004: Melchior Award 
2007: Beata Pawlak Award
2007: Nike Audience Award for Gottland
2007: Angelus Award finalist
2009: Prix Amphi in Lille 
2009: European Book Prize for Gottland
2013: Journalist of the Year Award
2014: Knight's Cross of the Order of Polonia Restituta
2014: Bene Merito Honorary Badge
2019: Nike Award for Nie ma

Works 
Niedziela, która zdarzyła się w środę (Sunday that Happened on Wednesday), Warsaw 1996;
Na każdy temat – talk show do czytania, with Witold Orzechowski, (On Every Topic), Warsaw 1997;
Gottland, Berlin 2008;
20 lat nowej Polski w reportażach według Mariusza Szczygła (20 Years of New Poland in Reportage Writing), Wołowiec 2009;
Kaprysik. Damskie historie, Warszawa 2010;
Zrób sobie raj (Make Your Own Paradise), Wołowiec 2010;
Láska nebeská, Warsaw 2012;
Projekt: prawda (Project: Truth), Warsaw 2016;
Nie ma, Warsaw 2018
Osobisty przewodnik po Pradze (A Personal Guidebook Through Praga), Warsaw 2020.

In anthologies

Kraj Raj (The Land Paradise), Warsaw 1993;
Wysokie Obcasy. Twarze (High Heels. Faces), Warsaw 2003;
Ouvertyr till livet, Stockholm 2003;
La vie est un reportage. Anthologie du reportage litteraire polonais, Montricher 2005;
Von Minsk nach Manhattan. Polnische reportagen, Vienna 2006.

See also
Polish literature
List of Polish writers

References

External links 

Mariusz Szczygieł at culture.pl
About "Gottland" by Mariusz Szczygieł
About "Make your own paradise" by Mariusz Szczygieł

Polish journalists
Polish male writers
Living people
1966 births
Nike Award winners
Polish atheists
Polish LGBT rights activists
Polish gay writers